The Ainu creation myths are the traditional creation accounts of the Ainu peoples of Japan. Their stories share common characteristics with Japanese creation myths and earth diver creation stories commonly found in Central Asian and Native American cultures. Ainu mythology divides time into three tenses: "Mosir sikah ohta" ("when the universe was born"),  "mosir noskekehe" ("centre of the world"), and "mosir kes" ("end of the world", about which there are no detailed concepts recorded from Ainu mythology). In one version, the creator deity sends down a water wagtail to create habitable land in the watery world below. The little bird fluttered over the waters, splashing water aside, and then he packed patches of the earth firm by stomping them with his feet and beating them with his tail.  In this way, islands where the Ainu were later to live were raised to float upon the ocean.

Because Ainu tend to be somewhat hirsute, at least in comparison to other East Asian populations, many Ainu stories maintain that their first ancestor was a bear. However, an alternative version tells of Kamuy sending a heavenly couple to earth called Okikurumi and Turesh. This couple had a son, whom some consider the first Ainu, and he is believed to have given the people the necessary skills to survive.

English missionary John Batchelor related a myth the Ainu told him wherein before the first kamuy created the world, there was only a vast swamp in which lived a large trout, and the creator placed the world upon the trout, so that the fish sucks in and spits out water from the sea, causing the tides.

Notes

References 
 
 

Ainu mythology
Creation myths